Seaweed farming or kelp farming is the practice of cultivating and harvesting seaweed. In its simplest form, farmers gather from natural beds. Alternatively, farmers fully control the crop's life cycle. 

The seven most cultivated taxa are Eucheuma spp., Kappaphycus alvarezii, Gracilaria spp., Saccharina japonica, Undaria pinnatifida, Pyropia spp., and Sargassum fusiforme. Eucheuma and K. alvarezii are attractive for carrageenan (a gelling agent); Gracilaria is farmed for agar; the rest are farmed for food. Seaweeds are different from mangroves and seagrasses, as they are photosynthetic algal organisms and are non-flowering. 

The largest seaweed-producing countries are China, Indonesia, and the Philippines. Other notable producers include South Korea, North Korea, Japan, Malaysia, and Zanzibar (Tanzania). Seaweed farming has frequently been developed to improve economic conditions and to reduce fishing pressure.

The Food and Agriculture Organization (FAO), reported that world production in 2019 was over 35 million tonnes. North America produced some 23,000 tonnes of wet seaweed. Alaska, Maine, France, and Norway each more than doubled their seaweed production since 2018. As of 2019, seaweed represented 30% of marine aquaculture. 

Seaweed farming is a carbon negative crop, with a high potential for climate change mitigation. The IPCC Special Report on the Ocean and Cryosphere in a Changing Climate recommends "further research attention" as a mitigation tactic. World Wildlife Fund, Oceans 2050, and The Nature Conservancy publicly support expanded seaweed cultivation.

Methods

The earliest seaweed farming guides in the Philippines recommended the cultivation of Laminaria seaweed and reef flats at approximately one meter's depth at low tide. They also recommended cutting off seagrasses and removing sea urchins before farm construction. Seedlings are tied to monofilament lines and strung between mangrove stakes in the substrate. This off-bottom method remains a primary method.

Long-line cultivation methods can be used in water approximately 7 meters in depth. Floating cultivation lines are anchored to the bottom and are widely used in North Sulawesi, Indonesia. Species cultured by long-line include those of the genera Saccharina, Undaria, Eucheuma, Kappaphycus, and Gracilaria.

Cultivation in Asia is relatively low-technology with a high labor requirement. Attempts to introduce technology to cultivate detached plant growth in tanks on land to reduce labor have yet to attain commercial viability.

Ecological impacts

Seaweed is an extractive crop that has little need for fertilisers or water, meaning that seaweed farms typically have a smaller environmental footprint than other agriculture or fed aquaculture. Many of the impacts of seaweed farms, both positive and negative, remain understudied and uncertain.

Nonetheless, many environmental problems can result from seaweed farming. For instance, seaweed farmers sometimes cut down mangroves to use as stakes. Removing mangroves negatively affects farming by reducing water quality and mangrove biodiversity. Farmers may remove eelgrass from their farming areas, damaging water quality.

Seaweed farming can pose a biosecurity risk, as farming activities have the potential to introduce or facilitate invasive species. For this reason, regions such as the UK, Maine and British Columbia only allow native varieties.

Farms may also have positive environmental effects. They may support welcome ecosystem services such as nutrient cycling, carbon uptake, and habitat provision.  

Seaweed can be used to capture, absorb, and incorporate excess nutrients into living tissue, aka nutrient bioextraction/bioharvesting, is the practice of farming and harvesting shellfish and seaweed to remove nitrogen and other nutrients from natural water bodies.

Similarly, seaweed farms may offer habitat that enhances biodiversity. Seaweed farms have been proposed to protect coral reefs by increasing diversity, providing habitat for local marine species. Farming may increase the production of herbivorous fish and shellfish. Pollinac reported an increase in Siginid population after the start of farming of Eucheuma seaweed in villages in North Sulawesi.

Bacterial infection ice-ice stunts seaweed crops. In the Phillipines 15 percent reduction in one species appeared in 2011 to 2013, representing 268,000 tonnes of seaweed.

Economic impacts

In Japan the annual production of nori amounts to US$2 billion and is one of the world's most valuable aquaculture crops. The demand for seaweed production provides plentiful work opportunities.

A study conducted by the Philippines reported that plots of approximately one hectare could produce net income from Eucheuma farming was 5 to 6 times the average wage of an agriculture worker. The study also reported an increase in seaweed exports from 675 metric tons (MT) in 1967 to 13,191 MT in 1980, and 28,000 MT by 1988.

About 0.7 million tonnes of carbon are removed from the sea each year by commercially harvested seaweeds. In Indonesia, seaweed farms account for 40 percent of the national fisheries output and employ about one million people.

The Safe Seaweed Coalition is a research and industry group that promotes seaweed cultivation.

Uses  
Farmed seaweed is used in industrial products, as food, as an ingredient in animal feed, and as source material for biofuels.

Chemicals 
Seaweeds are used to produce chemicals that can be used for various industrial, pharmaceutical, or food products. Two major derivative products are carrageenan and agar. Bioactive ingredients can be used for industries such as pharmaceuticals, industrial food, and cosmetics.

Carrageenan

Agar

Food

Fuel

Climate change mitigation 
Seaweed cultivation in the open ocean can act as a form of carbon sequestration to mitigate climate change. Studies have reported that nearshore seaweed forests constitute a source of blue carbon, as seaweed detritus is carried into the middle and deep ocean thereby sequestering carbon. Macrocystis pyrifera (also known as giant kelp) sequesters carbon faster than any other species. It can reach 60 m in length and grow as rapidly as 50 cm a day. According to one study, covering 9% of the world’s oceans with kelp forests could produce “sufficient biomethane to replace all of today’s needs in fossil fuel energy, while removing 53 billion tons of CO2 per year from the atmosphere, restoring pre-industrial levels”. 

Seaweed farming may be an initial step towards adapting to climate change. These include shoreline protection through the dissipation of wave energy, which is especially important to mangrove shorelines. Carbon dioxide intake would raise pH locally, benefitting calcifiers (e.g. crustaceans) or in reducing coral bleaching. Finally, seaweed farming could provide oxygen input to coastal waters, thus countering ocean deoxygenation through driven by rising ocean temperature.

Tim Flannery claimed that growing seaweeds in the open ocean, facilitated by artificial upwelling and substrate, can enable carbon sequestration if seaweeds are sunk to depths greater than one kilometer.

Seaweed contributes approximately 16–18.7% of the total marine-vegetation sink. In 2010 there were 19.2 ×  tons of aquatic plants worldwide, 6.8 ×  tons for brown seaweeds; 9.0 ×  tons for red seaweeds; 0.2 ×  tons of green seaweeds; and 3.2 ×  tons of miscellaneous aquatic plants. Seaweed is largely transported from coastal areas to the open and deep ocean, acting as a permanent storage of carbon biomass within marine sediments.

Ocean afforestation is a proposal for farming seaweed for carbon removal. After harvesting seaweed is decomposed into biogas, (60% methane and 40% carbon dioxide) in an anaerobic digester. The methane can be used as a biofuel, while the carbon dioxide can be stored to keep it from the atmosphere.

Marine permaculture 
Similarly, the NGO Climate Foundation and permaculture experts claimed that offshore seaweed ecosystems can be cultivated according to permaculture principles, constituting marine permaculture. The concept envisions using artificial upwelling and floating, submerged platforms as substrate to replicate natural seaweed ecosystems that provide habitat and the basis of a trophic pyramid for marine life. Seaweeds and fish can be sustainably harvested. As of 2020, successful trials had taken place in Hawaii, the Philippines, Puerto Rico and Tasmania. The idea featured as a solution covered by the documentary 2040 and in the book Drawdown: The Most Comprehensive Plan Ever Proposed to Reverse Global Warming.

History 

Human use of seaweed is known from the Neolithic period. Cultivation of gim (laver) in Korea is reported in books from the 15th century. Seaweed farming began in Japan as early as 1670 in Tokyo Bay. In autumn of each year, farmers would throw bamboo branches into shallow, muddy water, where the spores of the seaweed would collect. A few weeks later these branches would be moved to a river estuary. Nutrients from the river helped the seaweed to grow.
In the 1940s, the Japanese improved this method by placing nets of synthetic material tied to bamboo poles. This effectively doubled production. A cheaper variant of this method is called the hibi method — ropes stretched between bamboo poles. In the early 1970s, demand for seaweed and seaweed products outstripped supply, and cultivation was viewed as the best means to increase production.

In the tropics, commercial cultivation of Caulerpa lentillifera (sea grapes) was pioneered in the 1950s in Cebu, Philippines, after accidental introduction of C. lentillifera to fish ponds on the island of Mactan. This was further developed by local research, particularly through the efforts of Gavino Trono, since recognized as a National Scientist of the Philippines. Local research and experimental cultures led to the development of the first commercial farming methods for other warm-water algae (since cold-water red and brown edible algae favored in East Asia do not grow in the tropics), including the first successful commercial cultivation of carrageenan-producing algae. These include Eucheuma spp., Kappaphycus alvarezii, Gracilaria spp., and Halymenia durvillei. In 1997, it was estimated that 40,000 people in the Philippines made their living through seaweed farming. The Philippines was the world's largest producer of carrageenan for several decades until it was overtaken by Indonesia in 2008.

Seaweed farming spread beyond Japan and the Philippines to southeast Asia, Canada, Great Britain, Spain, and the United States.

In the 2000s, seaweed farming has been getting increasing attention due to its potential for mitigating both climate change and other environmental issues, such as agricultural runoff. Seaweed farming can be mixed with other aquaculture, such as shellfish, to improve water bodies, such as in the practices developed by American non-profit GreenWave. The IPCC Special Report on the Ocean and Cryosphere in a Changing Climate recommends "further research attention" as a mitigation tactic.

See also 

 Seaweed fertilizer
Algaculture
 Aquaculture of giant kelp
 Natural resources of island countries
 Seaweed cultivator

References

Sources

External links 

 

Algaculture
Blue carbon
Seaweeds
Sustainable food system